Cara Black and Liezel Huber were the defending champions after defeating Tathiana Garbin and Nadia Petrova in the 2010 final. However they did not defend the title together, after splitting halfway through the 2010 season.
Black partnered with Anastasia Rodionova as the fourth seed, but they were eliminated in the first round, by Chuang Chia-jung and Hsieh Su-wei.
Huber played with Petrova as the second seed. They lost to Iveta Benešová and Barbora Záhlavová-Strýcová in the semifinals. This pair reached the final and won this tournament, by defeating 3rd seeds Květa Peschke and Katarina Srebotnik 4–6, 6–4, [10–7].

Seeds

  Gisela Dulko /  Flavia Pennetta (first round)
  Liezel Huber /  Nadia Petrova (semifinals)
  Květa Peschke /  Katarina Srebotnik (final)
  Cara Black /  Anastasia Rodionova (first round)

Draw

Draw
{{16TeamBracket-Compact-Tennis3
| RD1=First round
| RD2=Quarterfinals
| RD3=Semifinals
| RD4=Final
| RD1-seed01=1
| RD1-team01= G Dulko F Pennetta 
| RD1-score01-1=6
| RD1-score01-2=4
| RD1-score01-3=[7]
| RD1-seed02= 
| RD1-team02= K Jans A Rosolska 
| RD1-score02-1=3
| RD1-score02-2=6
| RD1-score02-3=[10]
| RD1-seed03= 
| RD1-team03= V Azarenka M Kirilenko 
| RD1-score03-1=6
| RD1-score03-2=6
| RD1-score03-3= 
| RD1-seed04= 
| RD1-team04= J Craybas R Stubbs
| RD1-score04-1=1
| RD1-score04-2=2
| RD1-score04-3= 
| RD1-seed05=3
| RD1-team05= K Peschke K Srebotnik
| RD1-score05-1=6
| RD1-score05-2=1
| RD1-score05-3=[10]
| RD1-seed06= 
| RD1-team06= T Bacsinszky R Voráčová
| RD1-score06-1=1
| RD1-score06-2=6
| RD1-score06-3=[7]
| RD1-seed07= 
| RD1-team07= J Görges L Raymond 
| RD1-score07-1=6
| RD1-score07-2=6
| RD1-score07-3= 
| RD1-seed08= 
| RD1-team08= A Hlaváčková L Hradecká 
| RD1-score08-1=1
| RD1-score08-2=4
| RD1-score08-3= 
| RD1-seed09= 
| RD1-team09= 
| RD1-score09-1=6
| RD1-score09-2=5
| RD1-score09-3=[10]
| RD1-seed10= 
| RD1-team10= M Niculescu Z Yan 
| RD1-score10-1=2
| RD1-score10-2=7
| RD1-score10-3=[3]
| RD1-seed11= 
| RD1-team11= C-j Chuang S-w Hsieh 
| RD1-score11-1=5
| RD1-score11-2=7
| RD1-score11-3=[10]
| RD1-seed12=4
| RD1-team12= C Black A Rodionova 
| RD1-score12-1=7
| RD1-score12-2=5
| RD1-score12-3=[7]
| RD1-seed13= 
| RD1-team13=

Notes

References

 Main Draw

W